De Achlumer Molen is a smock mill in Achlum, Friesland, Netherlands which has been restored to working order. The mill is listed as a Rijksmonument, number 15821.

History

De Achlumer Molen was built in 1851 to drain the Achlumer Noorderpolder. It worked by wind until 1954 when the cap and sails were removed and the smock tower fitted with a thatched conical roof. After that, an electric motor drove the Archimedes' screw.

In 1981, the mill was bought by Stichting De Fryske Mole (English: The Frisian Mills Foundation). The previous owner, Haye Thomas, a Dutch TV journalist, sold the mill for ƒ1. In September 2006 it was decided to restore the mill. The work was undertaken in the summer of 2007. On 18 October 2007 the new cap and sails were fitted to the mill. The restoration was carried out by Bouwbedrijf Hiemsta of Arum.

Description

De Achlumer Molen is what the Dutch describe as an achtkante grondzeiler – a smock mill whose  sails reach almost to the ground. It is a three-storey smock mill on a single-storey base. The smock and cap are thatched. The mill is winded by a tailpole and winch. The sails are one pair of Common sails and one pair of Patent sails. The Common sails are carried on the inner stock. They are carried on a cast-iron windshaft which was cast by Koning in 1909. The Brake wheel has 51 cogs. It drives the wallower (27 cogs) at the top of the upright shaft. At the lower end of the upright shaft, the crown wheel (42 cogs) drives the Archimedes' screw via a gearwheel with 39 cogs. It is inclined at 22½°. Each revolution of the screw lifts  of water.

Public access

Achlumer Molen is open to the public on the Dutch National Mills Day and also on the Frisian Mills Day.

References

External links
Website

Windmills in Friesland
Windmills completed in 1851
Smock mills in the Netherlands
Rijksmonuments in Friesland
Octagonal buildings in the Netherlands
1851 establishments in the Netherlands
19th-century architecture in the Netherlands